The Damen-Basketball-Bundesliga (DBBL) is the premier women's basketball championship in Germany. It was founded in 1947. DJK Agon 08 Düsseldorf and BTV 1846 Wuppertal are the most successful teams in the competition with twelve and eleven titles respectively, while TSV 1880 Wasserburg and Saarlouis Royals have dominated the competition in recent years. The leading teams from the DBBL enjoyed some success in FIBA Europe competitions in the 1980s and the 1990s, with Wuppertal winning the 1996 European Cup and Agon also reaching the competition's final in 1983 and 1986. The competition had been directly run by the German Basketball Federation (DBB) until 2001. On 21 June That year, the Damen-Basketball-Bundesligen GmbH was founded, an association which runs the first and second highest levels of women's club-level basketball in Germany.

2022-23 teams 

 Rheinland Lions
 TK Hannover Luchse
 Eigner Angels Nördlingen
 Rutronik Stars Keltern
 Alba Berlin
 Inexio Royals Saarlouis
 GiroLive Panthers Osnabrück
 Herner TC
 Eisvögel USC Freiburg
 GISA LIONS MBC
 BC Pharmaserv Marburg

Source

List of champions 

 1947 TC Jahn 1883 Munich
 1948 TC Jahn 1883 Munich
 1949 TSC Spandau 1880
 1950 TC Jahn 1883 Munich
 1951 TC Jahn 1883 Munich
 1952 Heidelberger TV 1846
 1953 Neuköllner SF
 1954 Heidelberger TV 1846
 1955 Heidelberger TV 1846
 1956 Heidelberger TV 1846
 1957 Heidelberger TV 1846
 1958 Heidelberger TV 1846
 1959 Heidelberger TV 1846
 1960 Heidelberger TV 1846
 1961 TV Augsburg 1847
 1962 TV Gross-Gerau
 1963 Heidelberger TV 1846
 1964 TV Augsburg 1847
 1965 ATV 1877 Düsseldorf
 1966 1. SC 05 Göttingen
 1967 ATV 1877 Düsseldorf
 1968 1. SC 05 Göttingen

 1969 VfL Lichtenrade
 1970 1. SC 05 Göttingen
 1971 1. SC 05 Göttingen
 1972 1. SC 05 Göttingen
 1973 Heidelberger SC
 1974 1. SC 05 Göttingen
 1975 DJK Agon 08 Düsseldorf
 1976 Düsseldorfer BG
 1977 Düsseldorfer BG
 1978 Bayer Leverkusen
 1979 Bayer Leverkusen
 1980 DJK Agon 08 Düsseldorf
 1981 DJK Agon 08 Düsseldorf
 1982 DJK Agon 08 Düsseldorf
 1983 DJK Agon 08 Düsseldorf
 1984 DJK Agon 08 Düsseldorf
 1985 DJK Agon 08 Düsseldorf
 1986 DJK Agon 08 Düsseldorf
 1987 DJK Agon 08 Düsseldorf
 1988 DJK Agon 08 Düsseldorf
 1989 BTV 1846 Wuppertal
 1990 DJK Agon 08 Düsseldorf

 1991 DJK Agon 08 Düsseldorf
 1992 Lotus Munich
 1993 BTV 1846 Wuppertal
 1994 BTV 1846 Wuppertal
 1995 BTV 1846 Wuppertal
 1996 BTV 1846 Wuppertal
 1997 BTV 1846 Wuppertal
 1998 BTV 1846 Wuppertal
 1999 BTV 1846 Wuppertal
 2000 BTV 1846 Wuppertal
 2001 BTV 1846 Wuppertal
 2002 BTV 1846 Wuppertal
 2003 BC Marburg
 2004 TSV 1880 Wasserburg
 2005 TSV 1880 Wasserburg
 2006 TSV 1880 Wasserburg
 2007 TSV 1880 Wasserburg
 2008 TSV 1880 Wasserburg
 2009 Saarlouis Royals
 2010 Saarlouis Royals
 2011 TSV 1880 Wasserburg
 2012 Wolfenbüttel Wildcats

 2013 TSV 1880 Wasserburg
 2014 TSV 1880 Wasserburg
 2015 TSV 1880 Wasserburg
 2016 TSV 1880 Wasserburg
 2017 TSV 1880 Wasserburg
 2018 Rutronik Stars Keltern
 2019 Herner
 2020 Canceled due tothe COVID-19 pandemic in Germany
 2021 Rutronik Stars Keltern
 2022 Eisvögel USC Freiburg
Source

References 

Basketball leagues in Germany
Germany
Women's basketball competitions in Germany